ELCI may refer to:
 Equipment Leakage Circuit Interrupter, a type of residual-current device
Employers' Liability Compulsory Insurance